The 38th edition of the World Allround Speed Skating Championships 1977 took place on 12 and 13 February in Keystone, Colorado.

Title holder was Sylvia Burka from the USA.

Distance medalists

Classification

 * = Fell

Source:

References

Attribution
In Dutch

1970s in speed skating
1970s in women's speed skating
World Speed Skating Championships
International speed skating competitions hosted by the United States
Sports in Colorado
International sports competitions hosted by the United States
World Allround Speed Skating Championships for women
World Allround Speed Skating Championships for women
World Allround Speed Skating Championships for women
World Allround Speed Skating Championships for women
Women's sports in Colorado